The orthothecids are one of the two hyolith orders.

Marek diagnoses the order thus: Conchs with a flat or concave ventral surface — opercula with large, flat cardinal processes but without clavicles – tightly sigmoidal, sediment-filled
intestine – helens absent.

Sometimes the Circothecidae and Tetrathecidae are split out into a separate order 'Circothecida', which is defined by the bottom surface not being flat, the cardinal processes being pronounced, and a circular rim sometimes showing hints of differentiation into clavicles.

Internal taxonomy 
Marek  gives the following diagnoses:

 Orthothecidae: Flat or concave bottom surface of conical shell. Transverse aperture.

Kouchinsky lists the following taxonomic criteria:

 Circothecidae: circular cross-section; same shape and sculpture on upper and lower surfaces.
 Turcurthecidae: oval or lenticular cross-section; top and bottom identical
 Allathecidae: top side flat or slightly convex; bottom side convex

Elsewhere is stated:

 Tetrathecidae: polyhedral cross-section; shell axially twisted
 Novitatidae: bottom side concave
 Lenatheca: aperture heart-shaped.

Additional genera are not assigned to a family:
 Probactrotheca 
 Pedunculotheca

References

Paleozoic invertebrates
Prehistoric animal orders
Hyolitha